Ayumi Hamasaki Trouble Tour 2020 A: Saigo no Trouble – Final is Japanese pop singer Ayumi Hamasaki's 45th video release. It was released on January 27, 2021.

The concert was a special online live event that was held on October 2, 2020 – Hamasaki's 42nd birthday – and streamed through Mu-mo, serving as the final concert of her Trouble Tour 2020 A: Saigo no Trouble.

Background

The concert was the finale of the Trouble Tour, which had to be put on hold and was eventually cancelled as a result of the ongoing COVID-19 pandemic, after 65 performances lasting from 2018 to 2020. A total of 35 performances had to be cancelled, which resulted in the show being reconstructed for the online live event.
The show features first-time performances of songs such as "It Was" and "Bye-bye Darling".

Release

The concert was released in two formats: a standard DVD version and the Blu-ray version. Both versions include a 40-page photobook.

The live streamed version had previously been available for a week after the performance on Mu-mo, until October 9, 2020, as a video on demand.

Track listing

Charts

References

 

2021 live albums

Ayumi Hamasaki video albums 

Avex Group video albums